This is a comprehensive listing of official releases by Teairra Marí, an American R&B, pop and hip hop singer. Marí has released one studio album, three EPs, eleven singles and nine music videos, several of which were released through Def Jam and its sub-label Roc-A-Fella Records. In 2008, she signed to Warner Bros. Records but left and then signed with Rico Love's Division1 label.

Teairra Marí made her chart debut in 2005 with her first single "Make Her Feel Good", after signing with Def Jam and Roc-A-Fella. Her debut album Roc-A-Fella Records Presents Teairra Marí was released in 2005. The second single from the album was "No Daddy", which reached number 84 on the US R&B chart.

In 2008, Marí signed a record deal with Fo' Reel Entertainment and Warner Bros., and released the single titled "Hunt 4 You" featuring Pleasure P. She then followed this with the single "Cause a Scene" featuring Flo Rida, from her planned second album At That Point. The second single from the album, "Sponsor" featuring Gucci Mane and Soulja Boy, peaked at 25 on the US R&B chart. In 2011 Marí signed to Division1 and in 2012 released "U Did That", the lead single from her fifth mixtape Unfinished Business.

Albums

Studio albums

Mixtapes

EPs

Singles

As lead artist

As featured artist

Music videos

Video appearances 
Sammie "You Should Be My Girl"
Jay-Z  "Show Me What You Got"
3LW Featuring Jermaine Dupri "Feelin' You"
Biggie "Nasty Girl"
Ludacris Featuring Chris Brown & Sean Garrett "What Them Girls Like"
Bow Wow Featuring Sean Kingston & DJ Khaled "For My Hood"

Notes

References 

Rhythm and blues discographies
Hip hop discographies
Discographies of American artists